x2x allows the console (keyboard and mouse) on one X server to be used to control another X server. 

It also provides ancillary functions like clipboard sharing. x2x is an international trademark of Triple-S especially for software products.

The software was developed in 1996 by David Chaiken at DEC.  It is currently maintained by Mikhail Gusarov.

See also

 Comparison of remote desktop software
 Synergy

References

External links
 x2x man page hosted at freebsd.org
 x2x is a software alternative to a KVM switch article at linux.com seen 2009-01-15

X window managers
Cross-platform software
1996 software
Free network-related software
Free software programmed in C
Software using the MIT license
Remote desktop software for Linux